Gradec is a village located ~50 km from Zagreb, Croatia.

 Buzadovac - 134
 Cugovec - 390
 Festinec - 70
 Fuka - 120
 Grabrić - 85
 Gradec - 490
 Gradečki Pavlovec - 506
 Haganj - 534
 Lubena - 123
 Mali Brezovec - 90
 Podjales - 190
 Pokasin - 52
 Potočec - 104
 Remetinec - 74
 Repinec - 255
 Salajci - 88
 Stari Glog - 115
 Tučenik - 122
 Veliki Brezovec - 188
 Zabrđe - 188

Famous people 
 Nevenka Topalušić

References 

Populated places in Zagreb County
Municipalities of Croatia